Dringue, Castrito y la lámpara de Aladino is a 1954 Argentine film directed by Luis Moglia Barth.

Cast
 Dringue Farías
 Carlos Castro "Castrito"
 Carmen Torres
 Pascual Nacaratti
 Tincho Zabala
 Carlos Enríquez
 Teresa Pintos
 Mariano Bauzá
 Carmen Amaya …Bailarina
 Eduardo Armani		
 Alfonso Pisano

References

External links
 

1954 films
1950s Spanish-language films
Argentine black-and-white films
Films directed by Luis Moglia Barth
1950s Argentine films